The 5.45×39mm PSP cartridge is a rimless bottlenecked Intermediate cartridge. It was introduced into service in 2005 together with ADS amphibious rifle by Russia. This special cartridge was made for underwater use in ADS rifle and based on standard 5.45×39mm.

There are two variants of it. PSP with heavy 16.4g tungsten alloy bullet and PSP-UD with 14.5g bronze bullet.

References

See also 
List of rifle cartridges

ADS Rifle

Pistol and rifle cartridges
Military cartridges